Pescia Fiorentina is a village in Tuscany, central Italy, administratively a  of the  of Capalbio, province of Grosseto. At the time of the 2001 census, its population amounted to 37.

Geography 
It is situated in the plain of southern Maremma, in the valley of Fiora, between the hills of Capalbio and the Tyrrhenian Sea, on the border with the province of Viterbo, Lazio. It is located along the Provincial Road which links Capalbio to Chiarone Scalo.

History 
Pescia Fiorentina was an important industrial centre with furnaces and ironworks in the 16th century.

Main sights 
 Villa del Fontino (18th century) was the seat of customs between the Grand Duchy of Tuscany and the Papal States. The palace was then named after the families who lived there after the dismantling of customs: Boncompagni and Magrini. The palazzo was then transformed into a farmhouse hotel.
  (Tarot Garden), situated in the hamlet of Garavicchio, is a sculpture garden based on the esoteric tarot created by French artist Niki de Saint Phalle. The park was opened in 1998.

References

Bibliography

See also 
 Borgo Carige
 Capalbio Scalo
 Chiarone Scalo
 Giardino, Capalbio
 La Torba

Frazioni of Capalbio